T-155 Fırtına (Turkish for Storm) is a Turkish variant of K9 Thunder 155 mm self-propelled howitzer originally developed by South Korea. It is manufactured and assembled by Turkish Land Forces at the 1010th Army Equipment Repair Factory using imported subsystems from Korea. It has an ongoing upgrade project dubbed as T-155 Fırtına II, possibly changing its engine to Ukraine origin to avoid Germany's restriction on Turkey's defense sales.

Development

General characteristics 

The T-155 retains most of the K9's features, such as the CN98 155 mm barrel and chassis, produced through the technology transfer of Agency for Defense Development (ADD) in South Korea. However, its turret reflects original Turkish design, increasing both ammunition capacity and combat weight, thus reducing power to weight ratio. APU (auxiliary power unit) is installed while commander's panoramic sight is removed. Parts of the chassis, the INS (inertial navigation system), and electronic systems such as the radio and FCS (fire control system) were developed in Turkey. Inertial Navigation system was produced by ASELSAN.

The howitzer is able to determine the coordinates of the targets at 17.5 meters deviation. Fırtına can open fire within 30 seconds.

The T-155 Fırtına has a maximum firing range of 40 km, depending on the type of ammunition. It can reach a top speed of 66 km/h.

The gun is produced by MKEK under license by transferring the production technology of the K9's CN98 155 mm barrel from ADD. The production rate of the T-155 is 24 units per year. More than 350 T-155 Fırtına howitzers were planned to be produced. 281 have been delivered between 2005 and 2010.

An upgraded version dubbed "Firtina 2" was to begin production in 2017, featuring improvement to range and rate of fire. The new vehicles were to be fitted with remote weapons stations capable of carrying 12.7mm, 7.62mm machine guns and 40 mm grenade launchers.

Poyraz Ammunition Resupply Vehicle 

The Poyraz Ammunition Resupply Vehicle (ARV) is an indigenous vehicle with an ammunition transfer system similar to that of the South Korean K10 ARV. The vehicle has a boom that is extended towards the rear of the T-155 Fırtına turret, where the resupply takes place. The Poyraz ARV has an auxiliary power unit, which the K10 ARV lacks, that allows the vehicle's crew to use electronics and communication systems, and to run an ammunition transfer system economically without the main engines being turned on.

The Poyraz ARV can carry up to 96 155 mm shells and is able to transfer 48 shells in 20 minutes. It has a range of 360 km.

Operational history 
The T-155 Fırtına was first deployed in Turkey's Operation Sun at the end of 2007 into January 2008 to fight the PKK militants in the northern part of Iraq. It was used in 2012 Syrian–Turkish border clashes and again during both the Jarabulus offensive (2016) and the Afrin offensive (2018).

Operators

Current operators
  Turkey originally planned to manufacture 350 Fırtına, 280 for Turkish Army and 70 for future customer, by 2011 per agreement with South Korea in exchange for free technology transfer from the Agency for Defense Development of South Korea. Turkey built 280 for its military use only.

Future operators

See also

Similar vehicles 
 AS-90
 AHS Krab
 Msta-S 2S19
 Panzerhaubitze 2000
 PLZ-05
 PLZ-45
 Type 99 155 mm self-propelled howitzer

References 

155 mm artillery
Tracked self-propelled howitzers
Self-propelled howitzers of Turkey
South Korea–Turkey relations
Military vehicles introduced in the 2000s